Information art, which is also known as informatism or data art, is an emerging art form that is inspired by and principally incorporates data, computer science, information technology, artificial intelligence, and related data-driven fields. The information revolution has resulted in over-abundant data that are critical in a wide range of areas, from the Internet to healthcare systems. Related to conceptual art, electronic art and new media art, informatism considers this new technological, economical, and cultural paradigm shift, such that artworks may provide social commentaries, synthesize multiple disciplines, and develop new aesthetics. Realization of information art often take, although not necessarily, interdisciplinary and multidisciplinary approaches incorporating visual, audio, data analysis, performance, and others. Furthermore, physical and virtual installations involving informatism often provide human-computer interaction that generate artistic contents based on the processing of large amounts of data.

Background 

Information art has a long history as visualization of qualitative and quantitative data forms a foundation in science, technology, and governance. Information design and informational graphics, which has existed before computing and the Internet, are closely connected with this new emergent art movement. An early example of informatism the 1970 exhibition organized called "Information" at the Museum of Modern Art in New York City (curated by Kynaston McShine). This is the time when conceptual art has emerged as a leading tendency in the United States and internationally. At the same time arose the activities of Experiments in Art and Technology known as E.A.T.

Contemporary practices 
Information art are manifested using a variety of data sources such as photographs, census data, video clips, search engine results, digital painting, network signals, and others. Often, such data are transformed, analyzed, and interpreted in order to convey concepts and develop aesthetics. When dealing with big data, artists may use statistics and machine learning to seek meaningful patterns that drive audio, visual, and other forms of representations. Recently, informatism is used in interactive and generative installations that are often dynamically linked with data and analytical pipelines.

See also

Examples
 The Tempestry Project
 Warming stripes 
 Climate spiral

Related subjects
 Algorithmic art
 Climate change art
 Computer art
 Conceptual art 
 Data visualization
 Digital art
 Experiments in Art and Technology
 Generative art
 Knowledge visualization
 Post-conceptual art
 Roy Ascott
 Software art
 Systems art
 Systems thinking

References

Further reading
 Alan Liu (2004). "The Laws of Cool: Knowledge Work and the Culture of Information", University of Chicago Press
 Kenneth R. Allan, "Understanding Information," in Michael Corris (ed.), Conceptual Art, Theory, Myth, and Practice (Cambridge: Cambridge University Press, 2004), 144-68.
 Roy Ascott (2003). Telematic Embrace. (Edward A. Shanken, ed.) Berkeley: University of California Press. 
 Barreto, Ricardo and Perissinotto,  Paula   “the_culture_of_immanence”, in Internet Art. Ricardo Barreto e Paula Perissinotto (orgs.). São Paulo, IMESP, 2002. .
 Jack Burnham, (1970) Beyond Modern Sculpture: The Effects of Science and Technology on the Sculpture of this Century (New York: George Braziller Inc.
 Bullivant, Lucy (2007). 4dsocial: Interactive Design Environments (Architectural Design). London: John Wiley & Sons. 
 Bullivant, Lucy (2006). Responsive Environments: architecture, art and design (V&A Contemporary). London:Victoria and Albert Museum. 
 Bullivant, Lucy (2005). 4dspace: Interactive Architecture (Architectural Design). London: John Wiley & Sons. 
 Oliver Grau, Virtual Art, from Illusion to Immersion, MIT Press/Leonardo Book Series (Leonardo/ISAST), 2004, pp. 237–240, 
 Paul, Christiane (2003). Digital Art (World of Art series). London: Thames & Hudson. 
 Peter Weibel and Shaw, Jeffrey, Future Cinema, MIT Press 2003, pp. 472,572-581, 
 Wilson, Steve Information Arts: Intersections of Art, Science and Technology Information Arts: Intersections of Art, Science, and Technology, MIT Press/Leonardo Book Series (Leonardo/ISAST) 
 Kynaston McShine, "INFORMATION", New York, Museum of Modern Art., 1970, First Edition. ISBN LC 71-100683
 Jack Burnham, 'Systems Esthetics,' Artforum (September, 1968); reprinted in Donna de Salvo (ed.), Open Systems: Rethinking Art C. 1970 (London: Tate Publishing, 2005) 
 Edward A. Shanken, 'Art in the Information Age: Technology and Conceptual Art,' in Michael Corris (ed.), Conceptual Art: Theory, Myth and Practice (Cambridge: Cambridge University Press, 2004). 
 Marga Bijvoet, (1997) Art as Inquiry: Toward New Collaborations Between Art & Science, Oxford: Peter Lang
Frank Popper (1993) Art of the Electronic Age, Thames and Hudson Ltd., London, and Harry N. Abrams Inc, New York, 
Pavilion: Experiments in Art and Technology. Klüver, Billy, J. Martin, B. Rose (eds). New York: E. P. Dutton, 1972
 Dick Higgins, 'Intermedia' (1966), reprinted in Donna De Salvo (ed.), Open Systems Rethinking Art c. 1970 (London: Tate Publishing, 2005)
 Nicolas Bourriaud, Relational Aesthetics (Dijon: Les Presses du Réel, 2002, orig. 1997) 
 Charlie Gere Digital Culture (Reaktion, 2002)

External links 
Intersections of Art, Technology, Science and Culture- Links 
The Danish Artnode Foundation-Links
(FILE) Electronic Language International Festival.
Leonardo/The International Society for the Arts, Sciences and Technology
datengraphie (datagrafy) is art using data as direct material

Computer art
Artistic techniques

Contemporary art
Art
Visual arts genres
Information
The arts
Digital art